Head over Heels in Love may refer to:

 Head over Heels in Love (film) or Head over Heels, a 1937 British musical film
 "Head over Heels in Love" (song), by Kevin Keegan, 1979
 "Head over Heels in Love", a song by Don Wayne, 1958
 "Head over Heels in Love", a song by Glenda Collins, 1961

See also
 Head over Heels (disambiguation)